Dimapur Jain Temple is a Jain temple built in 1947. The temple is located in Jain Temple Road, and has Lord Mahavira as its Moolnayak. The temple  is under the aegis of the SD Jain Samaj Dimapur.

History
During the pre-independence era, most of the Jain families were settled in Kohima. All these families belong to the Digambara sect. In 1920, eight Sethi families, who were non Naga Settlers, built the first Jain temple in Kohima in Nagaland. However these families moved to Dimapur in 1944 due to Japanese invasion during World War II. These families then built the Dimapur Jain Temple, SD Jain School, SD Jain Charitable Hospital. The most prominent among these were Shri Phulchand Sethi, Shri Jethmal Sethi, Shri Kanhaiyalal Sethi, Hardev Sethi, Hiralal Sethi and Shri Mangilal Chabra. Shri Phulchand Sethi was the first secretary of the SD Jain Samaj, Dimapur and continued on this post till 1976. Shri Udayram Ji Chabra was the first president of the SD Jain Samaj followed by Shri Jethmal Sethi.

The Temple Complex
The Moolnayak of the temple is Lord Mahavira. In the back portion of the temple, the statues of Lord Adinath, Lord Bahubali, Lord Bharat Swami stand tall. The back portion was built later in 1989. The Panch kalyanak of the statues was conducted by Ganini Shri Suparshmati Mataji in 1989. On the first floor is the Samavsaran and the Chaubisi (idols of all the twenty-four Tirthankaras).

Gallery

See also
Jainism in Nagaland
Dimapur

References
http://www.easternmirrornagaland.com/dimapur-jain-community-observes-paryushan/
http://nagalandpost.com/Showstory.aspx?npoststoryiden=TkVXUzEwMDA3ODI0OQ%3D%3D-g5kS%2Bd197Sg%3D

Sources  
 Sethi, Raj Kumar (2021), 100 years of Jainism in Nagaland - (A journey from 1885 to 1985), Walnut Publication, 

Religious buildings and structures completed in 1947
1947 establishments in India
Jain temples in Nagaland
20th-century Jain temples